Bukowski (feminine Bukowska) is a Polish surname. It is composed of buk (Common Slavic for "beech tree") and the suffixes -ow and -ski. In some cases, the name may originate from a toponym, i.e. the name would have been given to or adopted by a person or family from a place named Buków, for example.

People
 Adrian Bukowski, Polish footballer
 Aleksandra Bukowska-McCabe (born 1977), Polish diplomat
 Annamaria Orla-Bukowska, Polish social anthropologist
 Barbara Hesse-Bukowska (1930-2013), Polish pianist
 Barbora Bukovská, Czech-Slovak human rights attorney
 Charles Bukowski (1920-1994), American poet, novelist, and short story writer
 Dorota Bukowska (born 1972), Polish basketball player
 John Bukovsky (1924–2010), Slovakia-born American prelate of the Catholic Church
 John Bukowski (born 1939), Australian boxer
 Gary Bukowski, List of Western Suburbs Magpies players
 Helena Bukowska-Szlekys (1899-1954), Polish sculptor
 Henryk Bukowski (1839-1900), Polish nobleman, Bukowskis auction house
 Miroslav Bukovsky, Czech-Australian trumpeter and flugelhorn player, arranger and composer and bandleader of Wanderlust (jazz band). 
 Piotr Bukowski (born 1963), German water polo player
 Ronald Bukowski, American oncologist, urologist, and a professor of medicine
 Stanisław Bukowski (1923-2002), Polish cross-country skier
 Vladimir Bukovsky (1942-2019), former Soviet political dissident, author and political activist

Fictional character
 Bukowski family from Poland (novel) by James Michener
 Charlie Bukowski from Cannibal Apocalypse
 Claude Bukowski from Hair (film)
 Doug Bukowski, Catherine Bukowski, Lynn Bukowski, List of Mutants in The Hills Have Eyes
 Fante Bukowski, character by Noah Van Sciver
 Stanley Bukowski, List of Oz (TV series) characters
 Ted Bukovsky from Kuffs
 Victor Bukowski from The Man with Rain in His Shoes

Related forms
Bukač (disambiguation) (surname)
Buková (disambiguation) (place name)
Bukov (disambiguation)
Buków (disambiguation) (place name)
Bukovina (place name)
Bukowsko (place name)

See also
 Bukowski (disambiguation)

Polish-language surnames
Toponymic surnames